Martha Mitchell may refer to:

 Martha Mitchell (1918-1976), wife of John N. Mitchell, United States Attorney General under President Richard Nixon
 Martha Reed Mitchell (1818-1902), American philanthropist and socialite
 Martha Mitchell (author) (died 2011), American librarian and archivist
 Martha Mitchell (director), American television director.

See also
 Martha Mitchell effect, process by which a medical professional labels a patient's accurate perception of real events as delusional